Marc Edward May (born January 1,1956) is a former American football tight end who played one season with the Minnesota Vikings of the National Football League. He played college football at Purdue University and attended South Shore High School in Chicago, Illinois. He was also a member of the Dallas Cowboys, Chicago Blitz, New Jersey Generals, Orlando Renegades and Chicago Bruisers. May played for several other semi-pro teams throughout his career.

References

External links
Pro2U profile
Just Sports  Stats

Living people
1956 births
Players of American football from Chicago
American football tight ends
African-American players of American football
Purdue Boilermakers football players
Dallas Cowboys players
Chicago Blitz players
New Jersey Generals players
Minnesota Vikings players
Chicago Bruisers players
National Football League replacement players
21st-century African-American people
20th-century African-American sportspeople